Bålsta is a railway station located in Bålsta in Håbo municipality, Uppsala County, Sweden. It is located 45.3 km from Stockholm Central Station on the Mälaren Line. The station serves long-distance and regional SJ trains, and is also the north-west terminus for Stockholm's commuter trains, despite being located just outside of Stockholm County.

The long-distance train section has two tracks and a central platform. Regional trains stop at Bålsta Station on the Gothenburg-Hallsberg-Västerås-Stockholm route. At the southern end of the main platforms there is an entrance and ticket hall to the SL commuter train section which consists of a track and a side platform.

Until 2018, there was a station building, below the south side of the railway embankment. This was demolished in May 2018, as part the planned redevelopment of the centre of Bålsta. A new bus station area was opened in January 2021.

History 
The station was first opened in 1876, through the opening of the Stockholm-Västerås-Bergslagen railway. Passenger train traffic remained until 1972, when the station was closed. The old station building still exists about 1.5 km west of the current station.

The current station was opened in 1996, as part of work to expand regional train traffic on the Mälaren Line. In 2001, Stockholm's commuter train service was extended to Bålsta, and it is now the terminus of SL Line 43.

Gallery

Old Station

Exterior

Main Platforms

Commuter Train Station

References 

Håbo Municipality
Railway stations opened in 1867
Railway stations closed in 1972
Railway stations opened in 1996
Railway stations in Uppsala County
1867 establishments in Sweden
1972 disestablishments in Sweden
1996 establishments in Sweden